Lysol is a trade name for common household cleaners.

Lysol may also refer to:

 Lysol (album), a 1992 album by The Melvins
 Lysol,  a character portrayed by muMs da Schemer "The Mad Real World" skit on Chappelle's Show
 Lysol 200, an event in the 1999 NASCAR Busch Series